Sunbury: A Poetry Magazine was an American feminist magazine published and edited by Virginia Scott in Bronx, New York. The periodical was devoted to promoting the marginalized works of women, blue-collar, and minority poets. Apart from poetry, the magazine also published fiction, interviews, and reviews.

Sunbury published three times a year and has been by praised by other feminist publications such as Majority Report:"The quality of the poetry in Sunbury is high, high enough for a first-rate anthology, let alone for a poetry magazine published three times a year."

Writers published by Sunbury: 

 Ursula K. Le Guin
 Mary TallMountain 
 Linda Hogan
 Andrew Salkey
 Paula Gunn Allen
 Brenda Connor-Bey
 Bob Bohm
 Joan Lupo Batista
 Harryette Mullen
 Thom Lee
 Yuri Kageyama
 Teresa Anderson
 Margaret Randall
 David Henderson
 Meridel Le Sueur
 Sandra Esteves
 Thoman McGrath
 Manna Lowenfels-Perpelitt
 Steven Cannon
 Victor Hernandez Cruz
 Regina de Cormier-Shekerjian
 Mashadi Mashabela
 Hettie Jones
 Grace Paley

References 

Feminist magazines
Poetry publishers
Magazines published in New York City